Ahmad Keshvari (July 1953 – 7 December 1980) was an AH-1J SeaCobra pilot in the Army Aviation (Havanirooz) of Iran. He had a role in the early months of the Iran-Iraq War to stop Iraqi tanks from further advancing into the western Iranian territories.

He is known to often use the word "Simorgh" as the code name for his operations, thus the word is sometimes used to refer to him (in the title of works, etc.). The former Kiakola District of Qaemshahr County was separated as a new county in 2012, and its name was changed to Simorgh County by then-President Mahmoud Ahmadinejad after a non-official request by Keshvari's mother. Keshvari Rural District in Ilam, Keshvari Rural District in Mazanderan, and Keshvari Expressway in Isfahan provinces, as well as Shahid Keshvari Bridge of Babol are named after him. In the Shahid Keshvari Square of Kiakola, a statue of an AH-1J SeaCobra has been built to honor Keshvari. The date of his death, 7 December (15 Azar), is the "Havanirooz [Army Aviation] Day" in the  Iranian military calendar, and has been proposed by the Iranian army to be included in the official Iranian calendar.

Early life 
Keshvari was born in July 1953 in a middle-class family in Kiakola, Mazandaran Province, Iran. His parents were from Borujerd, Lorestan. His father, Gholamhossein, had been employed in the Imperial Iranian Gendarmerie, and had to migrate to various towns because of his job. His mother, Fatemeh Silakhori, was a religious and pro-Revolution woman. He spent his primary school and the three years of his high school in Kiakola, Mazanderan and then spent his high school in Qanad High School in Sarepol-e Talar village in Babol, Mazanderan. He passed the Iranian University Entrance Exam, but poverty prevented him from studying at normal universities, so he went to Imam Ali University, which was a free, military university.

Career and activities
In 1972, he was employed in the Imperial Iranian Army Aviation and passed the JetRanger and Cobra Piloting courses, earning the ranking of assistant lieutenant. When Islamic demonstrations began, Ahmad had an active role in the revolution. For engaging in activities against the Shah he was arrested and interrogated by SAVAK. When he started his job in Kermanshah, he started to identify poor people in the city. He could then organize a community fund with the help of some of his colleagues and the assistance of the Aviation Forces. He was also made commander of the Ilam Army Aviation Unit.

After the Islamic Revolution, he was involved in the operations to clear Kordestan and Kermanshah in western Iran from anti-revolutionaries. When Paveh, the center of clashes in Kermanshah was under attack and Mostafa Chamran and his men had been besieged, according to Major General Valiollah Fallahi, Keshvari was the first volunteer to launch an operation in Paveh. Ahmad Keshvari, along with Ali Akbar Shiroodi, Soheilian, and several others, performed an impressive operation and broke the Siege of Paveh and eventually liberated the city. Shiroodi has said that Ahmad was his "master".

In September 1980, when the Iran-Iraq war began, Keshvari, who had been wounded in the chest in the Kordestan clashes, immediately joined the battlefield, while having another scheduled surgery. Iraqis, with tanks and armoured vehicles, were advancing as large convoys toward Iranian territories. Keshvari usually had to rely on intelligence provided by local people, using a unit comprising several (TOW-capable) AH-1J SeaCobras, and a Bell 206A JetRanger multi-purpose utility helicopter, was attacking the convoy from both the front side and behind, creating confusion and chaos inside the convoy, and then retreating while another similar unit launched the final attack against the convoy. Using this tactic, which he named "Bekâv-o-Bokosh" (literally "Seek n Destroy"), which in turn later became the name of his aviation units, Keshvari's units managed to stop Iraqi tanks from further advancing into the Iranian territory and destroyed many Iraqi convoys in the western battlefields. In initial phases of the war, before IRGC and Basij forces had been formed, he was flying almost 12 hours per day, even though it was against aviation standards and rules.

In December 1980 at the age of 27, Keshvari and his co-pilot Rahim Pezeshki, along with another AH-1J SeaCobra piloted by Ali Akbar Shiroodi, and a Bell 206A JetRanger utility helicopter, launched Operation Ashura to destroy an Iraqi military convoy near Ilam Province borders headed toward Iran during Iran-Iraq War. The convoy was destroyed, but two Iraqi MiG-21s were approaching. Keshvari told the other two helicopters to retreat, and drew attention of the Iraqi fighters while heading toward an Iranian air defense site. The fighters attacked Keshvari's helicopter, causing it to crash. The JetRanger rescued the co-pilot Pezeshki, but was forced to flee and leave Keshvari's body as the Iraqi fighters were going to make another pass. Sahand rocket launcher of the Iranian air defense site downed one of the MiG-21s, while the second MiG fled. Keshvari's body was transferred to Kermanshah and was later buried in Tehran's Behesht-e Zahra cemetery as a military personal in 24th plot.

In 1361 (Solar Hejri), his brother, Mohammad, then aged under 17, joined the Iran-Iraq war, and was killed in Qasr-e Shirin during Operation Moharam.

In popular culture
In the documentary film Ravayat-e Fath ("The Chronicles of Victory"), directed by Morteza Aviny and filmed during Iran–Iraq war, there is an interview with Keshvari's uncle who was serving in the artillery, in Season Three.

Simorgh (December 1999), ed. Hojjat Shah-Mohammadi, Seyyed Amir Ma'soumi, Tehran: Haft, 212 pages; consisted of brief biographies of Ahmad Keshvari and Ali Akbar Shiroodi, and a collection of memories of officers and other people about them.

In 1992, Iranian television made a series that was about pilots of the western war zone such as Ali Akbar Shiroodi, Ahmad Keshvari, and Soheilian. Muhammad Jozani and Javad Hashemi portrayed Shiroodi and Ahmad Keshvari's roles, respectively, in this series whose director was Hossein Ghasemi Jami.

Flight Wing, which was presented at the 26th Tehran International Book Fair, reflects on the life of Ahmad Keshvari and has been written in a fictional way for young readers.

Dance of Dandelions ( Raghs-e Ghāsedak-hā) is a 2015 animated film directed by Vahid Shakeri and produced by Saba Animation Center. It depicts the last three days of Keshvari's life. It was awarded in 13th International Resistance Film Festival – Best Animation.

See also
List of Iranian commanders in the Iran–Iraq War

External links
 Gallery of Ahmad Keshvari in Sajed website
 Photograph of the statue of Keshvari in Kiakola

References

1953 births
1980 deaths
1980 in Iran
Iranian military personnel killed in the Iran–Iraq War
Army aviation personnel
Aviators killed by being shot down
Helicopter pilots